The Tocantins River is a river in the state of Pará, Brazil.
It is a tributary of the Jamanxim River.

The river basin is in the Jamanxim National Park.

References

Rivers of Pará